HK Košice is a handball club from Košice, Slovakia, that plays in the Niké Handball Extraliga.

History

The handball club was founded in 1967 under the name TJ VSŽ Košice. After the 1971/72 season, when they won the Czechoslovak 2nd League, the handball players from Košice were promoted to the Czechoslovak I.Liga, in which they played without a break until the classification of Czechoslovakia in 1993. In the 1977/1978 season, the club won its first Czechoslovakia league title. After that, he won the Czechoslovakia championship twice more: in the 1980/81 and 1988/1989 seasons. In 1980, they won the Czechoslovakia Cup. After the independence of Slovakia, they won the National Championship of Slovakia twice: in 1997 and 1999. They won the National Cup of Slovakia 9 times: in 1979, 1980, 1983, 1992, 1995, 1996, 1998, 1999 and 2003.

Naming history

Club crest

Sports Hall information

Name: – Handball aréna Bernolákova
City: – Košice
Capacity: – 500
Address: – Handball aréna, ZŠ Bernolákova 16, Košice, Slovakia

Management

Team

Current squad 

Squad for the 2022–23 season

Technical staff
 Head coach:  Martin Lipták
 Goalkeeping coach:  Richard Štochl
 Fitness coach:  Jaroslav Dulina
 Club doctor:  Dr. Peter Polan

Transfers

Transfers for the 2022–23 season

Joining 
  Patrik Hruščák (RB) from  HSC Suhr Aarau

Leaving

Accomplishments
National Championship of Slovakia: 2
1997, 1999
National Cup of Slovakia: 9
1979, 1980, 1983, 1992, 1995, 1996, 1998, 1999, 2003
Czechoslovakia Handball League: 3
1978, 1981, 1989
National Cup of Czechoslovakia: 1
1980

Former club members

Notable former players

  Radoslav Antl (1995–2001, 2009–2016)
  Vlastimil Fuňák (2000–2004, 2009–2016)
  Patrik Hruščák (2006–2008, 2011–2013, 2021–)
  Maroš Kolpak (1995–1997)
  Michal Kopčo (2004–2005)
  Radoslav Kozlov (2000–2002)
  Matej Mikita (2012–2016)
  Teodor Paul (2004–2008)
  Michal Shejbal (2002–2004, 2010–2011, 2021–)
  Richard Štochl (1998–1999)
  Martin Straňovský (2021–)
  Tomáš Urban (2006–2010)

References

External links
 
 

Slovak handball clubs
Sport in Košice